Frankenia fruticosa is a species of Frankeniaceae native to Knersvlakte, South Africa.  A woody shrub, it grows to a height of 35 cm.  It has small, rough leaves and white flowers.  It is most commonly found on the southern sides of the quartz covered slopes that typify the area.

References

Frankenia
Endemic flora of South Africa
Plants described in 2014
Taxa named by John Charles Manning